The Traveller Logbook is a 1979 science fiction tabletop role-playing game supplement, written by Dave Sering, and with art by Jennell Jaquays, and published by Judges Guild for Traveller. The Traveller Logbook contains printed record sheets on which players can log up to 10 characters with their UPPs, skills, equipment, service records, names, ranks, and more, and also has summary sheets for six starships, and nearly all the charts needed to generate Traveller characters.

Publication history
The Traveller Logbook was written by Dave Sering and was published in 1979 by Judges Guild as a 64-page book.

Reception
Bob McWilliams reviewed The Traveller Logbook for White Dwarf #15, giving it an overall rating of 9 out of 10, and stated that "the first section alone is probably worth the price."

William A. Barton reviewed The Traveller Logbook in The Space Gamer No. 32. Barton commented that "The Traveller Logbook is well worth the price. In fact, no serious Traveller player should be without one."

Notes

References

Judges Guild publications
Role-playing game supplements introduced in 1979
Traveller (role-playing game) supplements